The Flag of the Department of Cesar is one of the symbols that represent the Department of Cesar.

Design

The Flag of the Department of Cesar is a simple horizontal bicolor Triband, that is, it consists of 3 horizontal stripes, with two colors, green (top and bottom) and white in the middle.

Meaning
The color green symbolizes the vast vegetation of the region, and the white symbolizes peace, which is the goal hoped to achieve in the region.

See also
Coat of arms of Cesar
Flag of Valledupar
Gallery of triband flags

External links
 Meaning of flag by the Cesar government

C
Cesar Department